This is a list of notable microbreweries. A microbrewery is a brewery which produces a limited amount of beer. The qualifications to be classified as a microbrewery vary by country. The term "microbrewery" originated in the United Kingdom in the late 1970s to describe the new generation of small breweries which focused on producing traditional cask ale. The first example of this approach was Selby Brewery founded by Martin Sykes in 1972 in the Yorkshire town of the same name. Although originally "microbrewery" was used in relation to the size of breweries, it gradually came to reflect an alternative attitude and approach to brewing flexibility, adaptability, experimentation, and customer service. The term and trend spread to the United States in the 1980s, where it eventually was used as a designation of breweries that produce fewer than 15,000 U.S. beer barrels (1,800,000 liters) (475,000 U.S. gallons) annually.

Notable microbreweries

Located in the United States unless otherwise noted.

0–9
5 Rabbit Cervecería (founded 2009), Chicago, Illinois

A

 Abbey Brewing Company (founded 2003), Chama River Wilderness Area near Abiquiú, New Mexico
 Abita Brewing Company (founded 1986), Abita Springs, Louisiana. Original location is now the Abita Brew Pub
 Agassiz Brewing (1998–2010), Winnipeg, Manitoba, Canada
 Alaskan Brewing Company (founded 1986), Juneau, Alaska
 AleSmith Brewing Company (founded 1995), San Diego, California
 Allagash Brewing Company (founded 1995), Portland, Maine
 Amager Bryghus (founded 2007), Amager, Denmark
 Amsterdam Brewing Company (founded 1986), Toronto, Ontario, Canada
 Anderson Valley Brewing Company (founded 1987), Boonville, California
 Arcadia Brewing Company (founded 1996), Battle Creek, Michigan
 Argus Brewery (founded 2009), Chicago, Illinois

B
 

 La Barberie
 Bayern Brewing
 Bear Republic Brewing Company
 Beau's All Natural Brewing Company
 Belgh Brasse
 Bell's Brewery
 Bent Paddle Brewing Company
 Big Al Brewing
 BJ's Restaurant & Brewery
 Blackrocks Brewery, Marquette, Michigan
 Blue Hills Brewery
 Blue Mountain Brewery
 Blue Point Brewing Company
 Bluegrass Brewing Company
 Bluetongue Brewery
 Bootleg Brewery
 Boston Beer Company
 Boulder Beer Company
 Boundary Bay Brewing Company
 Les Brasseurs du Nord
 Brew Keeper
 BrewDog
 Brewery Ommegang
 Brick Brewing Company
 BridgePort Brewing Company
 Brooklyn Brewery
 Buffalo Bill's Brewery
 Burleigh Brewing Company
 By The Horns Brewing Co.

C

 Calfkiller Brewing Company
 Cameron's Brewing Company
 Canteen Brewhouse
 Capital Brewery
 Carakale Brewing Company
 Cascade Lakes Brewing Company
 Casco Bay Brewing Co.
 Cellis Brewery
 Chew Valley Brewery
 Christian Moerlein Brewing Co.
 The Church Brew Works
 Churchkey Can Company
 Cigar City Brewing
 Coastal Extreme Brewing Company
 Colonial Brewing Company
 Creemore Springs
 Cricket Hill Brewery

D

 Dangerous Man Brewing Company
 Dark Horse Brewery
 Devils Backbone Brewing Company
 Diamond Knot Brewing Company
 Dixie Brewing Company
Dogfish Head Brewery
 Dow Breweries
 Dragonmead
 Drake's Brewing Company
 Dugges Ale och Porterbryggeri

E
 Eden Brewery St Andrews
 Eel River Brewing Company
 Ellis Island Casino & Brewery
 Empyrean Brewing Company
 Erie Brewing Company

F

 F&M Brewery
 Fat Head's Brewery
 Feral Brewing Company
 Firestone Walker Brewing Company
 Fish Brewing Company
 Flying Bison Brewing Company
 Flying Dog Brewery
 Fort Garry Brewing Company
 Fort George Brewery
 Fóti Craft Brewery
 Founders Brewing Company
 Franconia Brewing Company
 Free State Brewery
 Fremont Brewing
 Fulton Beer

G

 Gage Roads Brewing Company
 Georgetown Brewing Company
 Gizmo Brew Works
 Gnarly Barley Brewing Company
 Golan Brewery
 Gordon Biersch Brewing Company
 Granville Island Brewing
 Great Basin Brewing Company
 Great Lakes Brewing Company
 Great Western Brewing Company
 The Great Yorkshire Brewery
 Green Flash Brewing Company
 Greenbush Brewing Company
 Gritty McDuff's Brewing Company

H

 Hair of the Dog Brewing Company
 Hale's Ales
 Half Acre Beer Company
 Half Pints Brewing Company
 Hamburger Mary's
 Harpoon Brewery
 Hawaii Nui Brewing Company
 Hilliard's Beer
 Hogs Back Brewery
 Holgate Brewhouse
 Holy Cow Casino and Brewery

I
 Ice Harbor Brewing Company
 Indeed Brewing Company

J
 Jackie O's Pub & Brewery
 Jarrow Brewing Company
 Jing-A Brewing Co.
 Jolly Pumpkin Artisan Ales

K

 King Brewery
 Kingdom Breweries
 Keweenaw Brewing Company, Houghton, Michigan
 Kona Brewing Company
 Kuhnhenn Brewing Company

L

 Lacons Brewery
 Lagunitas Brewing Company
 Lakefront Brewery (founded in 1987, Milwaukee, Wisconsin)
 Lakeport Brewing Company
 Little Creatures Brewery
 Lobethal Bierhaus
 London Fields Brewery
 Lone Tree Brewery
 Long Trail Brewing Company
 Lost Coast Brewery
 Lost Rhino Brewing Company

M

 Mad River Brewing Company
 Main Street Station Hotel and Casino and Brewery
 Malt Shovel Brewery
 Mammoth Brewing Company
 Marble Brewery
 Marshall Brewing Company
 Matilda Bay Brewing Company
 Matt Brewing Company
 McAuslan Brewing
 McMenamins
 Mendocino Brewing Company
 Metropolitan Brewing
 Michigan Brewing Company
 Midnight Sun Brewing Company
 Mikkeller
 Mill Street Brewery
 Milwaukee Brewing Company (founded in 1997, Milwaukee, Wisconsin)
 Mt. Begbie Brewing Company
 Mount Hope Estate
 Mt. Shasta Brewing Company
 Muskoka Cottage Brewery

N

 Nail Brewing
 Nashville Brewing Company
 Nelson Brewing Company
 New Belgium Brewing Company
 New Glarus Brewing Company
 New Orleans Lager and Ale Brewing Company
 Newburyport Brewing Company
 North Coast Brewing Company

O

 Off Color Brewing
 Ore Dock Brewing Company
 Otter Creek Brewing

P
 Paddock Wood Brewing Company
 Penn Brewery
 Penpont Brewery
 Pipeworks Brewing
 Port City Brewing Company
 Portland Brewing Company
 Primo Brewing & Malting Company
 Pyramid Breweries

Q
 Quidi Vidi Brewing Company

R

 Rahr and Sons Brewing Company
 The Rare Barrel
 Real Ale Brewing Company
 Rebellion Beer Company
 Red Oak Brewery
 Revolution Brewing (Illinois)
 Revolution Brewing (Colorado)
 RJ Rockers Brewing Company
 Rock Art Brewery
 Rock Bottom Restaurants
 Rogue Ales
 Rohrbach Brewing Company
 Russell Brewing Company
 Russian River Brewing Company

S

 Saint Arnold Brewing Company
 St Arnou
 Saint Louis Brewery
 San Francisco Brewing Company
 Santa Fe Brewing Company
 Saranac
 Sea Dog Brewing Company
 Shipyard Brewing Company
 Shmaltz Brewing Company
 Sierra Nevada Brewing Company
 Silver Gulch Brewing & Bottling Company
 Sixpoint Brewery
 SKA Brewing
 Small Town Brewery
 Smuttynose Brewing Company
 Southern Star Brewing Company
 Speakeasy Ales and Lagers
 Sprecher Brewery (founded in 1985, Milwaukee, Wisconsin)
 Steam Whistle Brewing
 Steelback Brewery
 Surly Brewing Company

T

 Terrapin Beer Company
 Third Street Aleworks
 Three Floyds Brewing
 Tired Hands Brewing Company
 Tractor Brewing Company
 Tree House Brewing Company
 Tring Brewery
 Trouble Brewing
 Trout River Brewing
 Tuckerman Brewing Company
 Two Brothers Brewing
 Twickenham Fine Ales

U
 Upland Brewing Company
 Upper Canada Brewing Company
 Upslope Brewing Company

V
 Victory Brewing Company

W

 Wachusett Brewing Company
 Walkerville Brewing Company
 War Horse Brewing Company
 Wellington Brewery
 Weyerbacher Brewing Company
 White Marsh Brewing Company
 Whitewater Brewery
Wild Rose Brewery
 Williamsburg AleWerks

Y
 Yards Brewing Company
 Yazoo Brewing Company
 Yukon Brewing Company

See also

 Beer and breweries by region
 Gypsy brewer
 Homebrewing
 List of bars
 List of countries by beer consumption per capita
 List of defunct breweries in the United States
 List of microbreweries in the Kingdom of Denmark
 List of public house topics
 Lists of breweries
 Microdistilling

References

Microbreweries
List
Lists of companies